This list of battles fought in New Mexico is an incomplete list of military and other armed confrontations that have occurred within the boundaries of the modern U.S. State of New Mexico since European contact. The region was part of the Viceroyalty of New Spain from 1535 to 1821, and then Mexico from 1821 to 1847. Over half of New Mexico was claimed by the Republic of Texas from 1836 to 1841, but control was never established in any form. Full administrative control of New Mexico was established on February 2, 1848 with the signing of the Treaty of Guadalupe Hidalgo which ended the Mexican–American War.

The Mexican–American War, American Civil War, and Plains Indian Wars all directly affected the region during westward expansion.

Battles

Notes

See also
 History of New Mexico
 Plains Indians Wars

Battles
New Mexico
Battles in New Mexico
Military history of New Mexico